Zemio Airport  is an airport serving the village of Zemio, in the Haut-Mbomou prefecture of the Central African Republic. The airport is located just northeast of the village.

See also

Transport in the Central African Republic
List of airports in the Central African Republic

References

External links
OpenStreetMap - Zemio
FallingRain - Zemio Airport
OurAirports - Zemio Airport

Airports in the Central African Republic
Buildings and structures in Haut-Mbomou